The Pharaoh eagle-owl (Bubo ascalaphus) is a species of owl in the family Strigidae.
It is native to Algeria, Chad, Egypt, Eritrea, Iran, Iraq, Israel, Jordan, Kuwait, Libya, Mali, Mauritania, Morocco, Niger, Oman, Palestine, Qatar, Saudi Arabia, Senegal, Sudan, Tunisia and the United Arab Emirates.

Description
The Pharaoh eagle-owl has a mottled plumage and large orange-yellow eyes. The head and upperparts are tawny and densely marked with black and creamy-white streaks and blotches, while the underparts are pale creamy-white, with black streaks on the upper breast and fine reddish-brown vermiculations on the lower breast and belly. The face has the disc-like form typical of most owls, defined by a dark rim, the robust bill is black and hooked, and the head is crowned with small ear tufts. There are two recognised subspecies of the Pharaoh eagle-owl, the Pharaoh eagle-owl (B. a. ascalaphus) and the desert eagle-owl (B. a. desertorum), the latter being smaller and paler with sandier colouration.

Distribution and habitat
The Pharaoh eagle-owl is native to much of northern Africa and the Arabian peninsula. In Africa its range extends from Mauritania, Morocco, Algeria and Tunisia in the west, through Mali, Niger and Chad to Libya, Sudan and Egypt. It is also known from Saudi Arabia, United Arab Emirates, Qatar, Oman, Israel, Jordan and Iraq. It is a vagrant to Senegal. Its habitat is mostly open arid country with rocky outcrops, plains, wadis and cliffs.

Behaviour and ecology

It will feed on any small creatures it can find including mammals, birds, snakes, lizards, beetles and scorpions. It perches on an eminence and watches and listens so as to detect moving prey before swooping down on its victim.

This owl is monogamous and forms a lifelong relationship. Breeding takes place in late winter and the nest is a scrape in a crevice or among rocks. Two eggs are laid and incubated by the female for about 31 days. The chicks are fed by both parents and leave the nest at about 20 to 35 days old, but remain reliant on their parents for several more months.

Conservation
The Pharaoh eagle-owl has a very large range and is reported as being abundant in at least part of the range. It faces no particular threats, and is therefore listed as Least Concern on the IUCN Red List.

References

External links

Pharaoh eagle-owl
Birds of North Africa
Birds of the Middle East
Birds of prey of Africa
Pharaoh eagle-owl
Taxonomy articles created by Polbot